Blessey is a former  commune in the Côte-d'Or department in eastern France. On 1 January 2009, Blessey was merged with Saint-Germain-Source-Seine to form the new commune of Source-Seine. Its population was 24 in 2006.

Demographics

See also
Communes of the Côte-d'Or department

References

Former communes of Côte-d'Or
Populated places disestablished in 2009